Charles Leonard Gehringer (May 11, 1903 – January 21, 1993), nicknamed "the Mechanical Man", was an American professional baseball second baseman, coach, general manager, and team vice president, who played in Major League Baseball (MLB) for the Detroit Tigers for 19 seasons (–). He was elected to the Baseball Hall of Fame in 1949.

Overview
Widely regarded as one of the greatest second basemen of all time, Gehringer compiled a .320 batting average and had seven seasons with more than 200 hits. The left-handed hitting, right-handed throwing star was the American League batting champion in 1937 with a .371 average and was also named the American League's Most Valuable Player. He was among the Top 10 vote recipients in the Most Valuable Player voting for seven straight years from 1932 to 1938. He was the starting second baseman and played every inning of the first six All Star Games. Gehringer was the only one to play every inning of the first 6 MLB all-star games, batted .500, didn't strike out and didn't make an error. In 81 AB in 3 World Series he struck out once. Perhaps the greatest 2-way player of all-time Gehringer was the first MLB middle infielder to turn 100 DPs in 6 seasons and is still the only middle IF ever to handle 900 chances in as many as 6 seasons. Only 4 players in MLB history have more seasons of 200 runs produced (Runs+RBI-HR) than Gehringer and only 3 did it more times consecutively. He is the only player since 1900 to accomplish all of the following in more than 2 seasons and he did 4 times: Play at least 150 games, at least .300 BA, at least .400 OB%, at least .500 SL% AND strike out fewer than 20 times. Gehringer is the only player since 1900 to finish among the top 10 in his league in both offensive AND defensive WAR as many as 6 consecutive seasons. In the 1930s, Babe Ruth called Gehringer "the greatest player in the game" and Lou Gehrig, Jimmie Foxx, and Mel Ott were all in their prime.       

Gehringer had career totals of 2,839 hits and 574 doubles. He was among the team's stars leading the Tigers to three American League pennants (1934, 1935, and 1940) and one World Series Championship (1935).  Gehringer hit .379 in the 1934 World Series, and .375 in the 1935 Series.

Gehringer had good plate discipline. He was tough to strike out, whiffing just 372 times in 8,860 at-bats, or once every 23.8 at-bats. He also had a very good walk-to-strikeout ratio, drawing 1,186 bases on balls against 372 strikeouts for a 3.19 to 1 walk-to-strikeout ratio. 

Gehringer was also one of the best-fielding second basemen in history, having led all American League second basemen in fielding percentage and assists seven times.  His 7,068 assists is the second-highest total in major league history for a second baseman. He also collected 5,369 putouts as a second baseman (the 6th highest total for a second baseman) and 1,444 double plays (the 7th highest total for a second baseman). He recorded a career .976 fielding percentage.

Known for his consistency as a hitter and fielder, Gehringer was given the nickname "the Mechanical Man" by Yankee pitcher Lefty Gomez. Teammate Doc Cramer quipped: "You wind him up Opening Day and forget him." A durable player, Gehringer had two consecutive game streaks of more than 500 games—one from 1927 to 1931 and the other from 1931 to 1935.

Career statistics:

Early years: 1903–1926
Gehringer was born on May 11, 1903, on a rented farm in Iosco Township, south west of Fowlerville, Michigan, in southwestern Livingston County, Michigan. He was the second son of Leonard Gehringer and Theresa (Hahn) (Eisele) Gehringer, both German Catholic immigrants. Both of his parents had been married previously, and Charlie had eight half-siblings from Leonard's first marriage, and a half-sister from his mother's first marriage. As a young boy the family moved to a different rented farm just south of Fowlerville in Handy Township, Michigan. Gehringer took physical education classes and played basketball and baseball. Gehringer later recalled that he lettered in basketball but not baseball.

In the fall of 1923, after his first year at the University of Michigan, Gehringer was discovered by Detroit Tigers left fielder Bobby Veach.  Veach heard about Gehringer, and brought him down to Navin Field to work out for a week and show the Tigers what he could do. Player-manager Ty Cobb was reportedly so impressed with Gehringer that he asked club owner Frank Navin to sign Gehringer to a contract on the spot. "I knew Charlie would hit and I was so anxious to sign him that I didn't even take the time to change out of my uniform before rushing him into the front office to sign a contract." Ty Cobb

In 1924, Gehringer played with London Tecumsehs in the Class B Michigan Ontario League.  He was called up briefly at the end of September and played five games for the Tigers, batting .462 in 13 at-bats.  Nevertheless, the 21-year-old Gehringer returned to the minor leagues where he played in 1925 for the Toronto Maple Leafs of the International League, and 8 games with the Tigers.

Gehringer's first full season in the big leagues was 1926, which was also Ty Cobb's last season as the Tigers' player-manager.  At first, Gehringer recalled that Cobb "was like a father to me."  Gehringer's father had died in 1924.  Cobb even made Gehringer use his own bat. According to Gehringer, Cobb's bat was "a thin little thing", and though Gehringer would have preferred a bigger bat, "I didn't dare use another one."  Gehringer hit .277 in his first full season, and collected 17 triples (2nd best in the American League).  Cobb and Gehringer subsequently had a falling out, and Gehringer later described Cobb as "a real hateful guy."  (Al Stump, Cobb: The Life and Times of the Meanest Man Who Ever Played Baseball (1994), p. 419)

Playing for the "small ball" oriented Cobb, who had been baseball's greatest player during its Deadball Era before Babe Ruth revolutionized offense with his home runs, Gehringer also had a career-high 27 sacrifice hits in 1926.  Six Tigers from the Cobb era (Donie Bush, Cobb, Harry Heilmann, Bobby Veach, Sam Crawford, and Ossie Vitt) rank in the Top 50 all time for sacrifice hits.  After Cobb's departure, Gehringer never again came close to 27 sacrifice hits.

Gehringer becomes a star: 1927–1933

In 1927, the Tigers had a new manager in George Moriarty and a lineup full of great hitters, including Heinie Manush, Harry Heilmann, Lu Blue, and Bob Fothergill.  The 1927 season was also the beginning of Gehringer's many seasons as a reliable .300 hitter.  In 1927, he hit .317 and scored 110 runs – 4th best in the American League.  He also led American League second basemen with 438 assists and 84 double plays.

In 1928, he played in all 154 games for the Tigers, hit .320, collected 193 hits (5th best in the league), scored 108 runs (5th best in the league), and had 507 assists (best in the league for a second baseman).  At the end of the 1928 season, Gehringer placed 19th in the voting for the American League's Most Valuable Player.

Gehringer's steady improvement as a hitter continued in 1929, as he hit .339 with an on-base percentage of .405, a slugging percentage of .532, and 106 RBI.  He also led the American League in many offensive categories, including hits (215), doubles (45), triples (19, including 3 in one game), runs (131), and stolen bases (27).  He also led the league in putouts (404) and fielding percentage (.975) by a second baseman.

Gehringer's consecutive game streak continued as he played in every game of the 1928, 1929, and 1930 seasons.  In 1930, he hit .330 with a .404 on-base percentage and a .534 slugging percentage (9th best in the American League).  He also scored 144 runs (3rd best in the league) and collected 201 hits, 78 extra base hits, 47 doubles (3rd in the league), 15 triples (5th in the league), and 19 stolen bases (2nd in the league).

Each year from 1926 to 1930, Gehringer improved his statistics in the three triple crown categories (batting average, home runs and RBI). The only other player to do that for five years running is Rogers Hornsby.

In relative terms, 1931 was an "off" year for Gehringer.  His consecutive game streak ended, as he played in 101 games.  He also fell below the .300 mark (batting .298) for the only time between 1926 and 1941.  Gehringer still had a fine year by most standards, and ended up No. 17 in the 1931 American League MVP voting.

In 1932, Gehringer was back at full strength, playing in 152 games and hitting .325 with 112 runs, 107 RBI, and 44 doubles (2nd best in the league).  Not generally known as a power hitter, Gehringer even hit 19 home runs in 1932, 7th best in the American League.  At the end of the year, Gehringer was 9th in the league's MVP voting.

In 1933, the "Mechanical Man" continued his string of consistent seasons, playing in 155 games, batting .330 (5th best in the American League), and collecting 204 hits (2nd in the league), 42 doubles (4th in the league), 105 RBI, and a career-high 542 assists (best in the league for 2nd basemen).  Gehringer was once again among the top vote recipients in the 1933 MVP voting, this time placing 6th.

A quiet man

Gehringer had a reputation as quiet and unassuming.  Player-manager Mickey Cochrane joked that "Charlie says `hello' on Opening Day, `goodbye' on closing day, and in between hits .350."

Gehringer acknowledged his quiet demeanor:
"I wasn't a rabble rouser.  I wasn't a big noisemaker in the infield, which a lot of managers think you've got to be or you're not showing.  But I don't think it contributes much."  Gehringer also had a sense of humor about his reputation.  At a civic banquet in his honor, Gehringer's entire speech consisted of the following: "I'm known around baseball as saying very little, and I'm not going to spoil my reputation."  When asked why he signed his name "Chas. Gehringer", he responded: "Why use seven letters when four will do?"  On another occasion, when asked about his closed-lip reputation, he responded: "Not true; if somebody asked me a question, I would answer them. If they said, 'Pass the salt,' I would pass the salt."

His unassuming nature is also reflected in his reaction to a "Charlie Gehringer Day" held by the Tigers in 1929.  Fans from Gehringer's hometown and throughout Detroit filled the stands for a 17–13 win over the Yankees.  Gehringer handled 10 chances at second base, had four hits including a home run, and stole home.  In a ceremony, the people of Fowlerville presented Gehringer with a set of golf clubs.  Though the clubs were right-handed, and Gehringer was left-handed, Gehringer learned to golf right-handed rather than trade for a left-handed set of clubs.

Back-to-back pennants (1934 and 1935)

In 1934, Gehringer had his best year to date, playing all 154 games and leading the Tigers to their first American League pennant in 25 years.  His .356 batting average and .450 on-base percentage were both 2nd best in the league.  He led the league in runs scored with 134 and hits with 214.  He was also among the league leaders in doubles with 42 (2nd best in the league) and RBI with a career-high 127 (5th best in the league).  Gehringer finished 2nd in the American League MVP voting, just 2 points behind Detroit's player-manager, Mickey Cochrane.

The Detroit infield in the mid-1930s was one of the best-hitting combinations in major league history.  With Hank Greenberg at first, Gehringer at second, Billy Rogell at shortstop, and Marv Owen at third, the 1934 Tigers infield collected 769 hits (214 by Gehringer, 201 by Greenberg, 179 by Owen and 175 by Rogell), 462 RBI (139 by Greenberg, 127 by Gehringer, 100 by Rogell, and 96 by Owen), and 179 doubles (63 by Greenberg, 50 by Gehringer, 34 by Owen and 32 by Rogell). Three members of the 1934 Tigers infield (Gehringer, Owen and Rogell) played in all 154 games, and the fourth (Greenberg) played in 153.

Gehringer's 127 RBI in 1934 is all the more remarkable given the fact that he played in the same lineup with one of the greatest RBI men of all time, Hank Greenberg.  Gehringer later recalled that Greenberg would tell him: "Just get the runner over to third", so Hank could drive them in.  Gehringer noted that "Hank loved those RBIs", to the point that Gehringer once kidded Greenberg: "You'd trip a runner coming around third base just so you could knock him in yourself."

The 1934 World Series was a match-up between St. Louis's "Gashouse Gang" and Detroit's' "G-Men" (so named because of stars Gehringer, Hank Greenberg, and Goose Goslin).  Even 50 years later, Gehringer (interviewed in 1982) felt the Tigers were robbed of the 1934 championship by umpire Brick Owens.  Detroit was ahead 3 games to 2, and in Gehringer's view "we should've won the sixth game."  Late in the game, Brick Owens called Mickey Cochrane out on a play at third base "even though all of the photographs show that he was safe by a mile." Gehringer insisted that, if Cochrane had been called safe, "we would've had the bases loaded with nobody out and we could've had a big inning."  The Tigers wound up losing Game 6 by one run.  They then lost Game 7 in an 11–0 shutout thrown by Dizzy Dean, despite a 2-for-4 game from Gehringer.  Gehringer can't be faulted for the World Series loss, as he played all seven games, batting .379 with an on-base percentage of .438 and a .517 slugging percentage.

In 1935, Gehringer and the Tigers won a World Series, beating the Chicago Cubs 4 games to 2. It was the Tigers' first-ever World Series win, after failing in the fall classic in four previous appearances. For the year, Gehringer hit .330 with a .409 on-base percentage and a .502 slugging percentage, collecting 201 hits, 123 runs, 108 RBI, and 19 home runs.  Once again, Gehringer was among the top vote getters in the MVP race, again losing to one of his own teammates, Hank Greenberg.

Gehringer also continued his consistent hitting into the 1935 World Series, where he played all six games, and hit .375 with a .423 on-base percentage, a .500 slugging percentage and 4 RBI.

1934 tour of Japan

After the 1934 season, Gehringer was part of the Major League All Star tour of Japan.  The American team included Gehringer, Babe Ruth, Lou Gehrig, and Jimmie Foxx. They played 18 games against a Japanese All Star Team.  The American team won all 18 games by a combined score of 189–39, but on November 20, 1934, 17-year-old Eiji Sawamura pitched seven shutout innings and had consecutive strikeouts of Gehringer, Ruth, Gehrig, and Foxx.  Gehringer recalled that, during batting practice, the Japanese fans would fill the 60,000 seat ballpark for every game. (Anthony Connor, "Voices from Cooperstown", p. 240.)

Life in the off-season

During the off-season, Gehringer worked as a sales clerk in the downtown Detroit Hudson's.  He also spent many years barnstorming with other Major League players.  One year, he traveled with a touring group from the Negro leagues, including Satchel Paige, Buck Leonard, Judy Johnson, and Mule Suttles.  Gehringer recalled that trying to hit Paige's fastball and hesitation pitch was "no fun." Paige said that Gehringer was the best white hitter he ever pitched against.

MVP award and batting crown

Although the 1936 Tigers finished in second place, 19½ games behind the Yankees, the 33-year-old Gehringer may have had his best season.  He led the American League in assists, double plays, and fielding percentage by a second baseman.  And he had career-bests in hits (227) slugging percentage (.555), runs (144), extra base hits (87), total bases (356) and runs created (152).  He also had a career-low 13 strikeouts in 641 at-bats during the 1936 season.  That equates to a strikeout every 49.3 times at bat.  He finished 4th in the MVP voting, as Lou Gehrig became the only non-Tiger to win the MVP award from 1934 to 1937.

Gehringer finally secured his own American League Most Valuable Player trophy, and a batting crown, in 1937.  Gehringer won the batting championship with a career-high .371 batting average and placed 2nd in on-base percentage with another career-high .458.  The 1937 season also saw Gehringer collect 209 hits (his 7th 200 hit season) and score 133 runs (one of twelve 100-plus run seasons).

In 1938, Gehringer had another solid year, batting .306 with a .425 on-base percentage (6th-best in the American League), 133 runs (3rd-best in the league), and career-highs in bases on balls with 113 (4th-best in the league), and home runs with 20.  Gehringer finished 10th in MVP voting in 1938.

Rogell and Gehringer

Gehringer played over 1,000 games with Billy Rogell as his double play partner at shortstop, making them one of the longest-tenured double-play combinations in the history of the game.  The two twice led the league in double plays. (Another Tiger duo, Lou Whitaker and Alan Trammell, holds the major league record with 1,918 games played as a double-play combination.)

Rogell's fiery demeanor was a stark contrast to the calm, quiet demeanor of Gehringer.  On one occasion, after both failed to cover second on a steal attempt, player-manager Mickey Cochrane charged out from behind the plate shouting at Rogell and Gehringer.  As reported in The New Bill James Historical Baseball Abstract (2001): "Rogell, astonished, looked at Gehringer to see if he was going to say anything.  Gehringer, of course, had nothing to say. 'Goddamn you,' yelled Rogell.  'Don't you come charging out here telling me how to play shortstop.  You go back there and do the catching, and I'll play shortstop.  If I'm not good enough, you can find someone else.'  Cochrane went back to his own position."

Final years and Hall of Fame

Although he missed a number of games in the 1939 and 1940 seasons, he continued to hit above .300, batting .325 in 1939 and .313 in 1940.  The 1940 season also saw the Tigers return to the World Series after four straight years of dominance by the Yankees.  Gehringer finished 14th in the MVP voting in 1939 and dropped to 23rd in 1940.  Gehringer hit .214 in 28 at-bats in a losing effort in the 1940 World Series against the Cincinnati Reds.

In 1941, Gehringer's 17 seasons began to catch up with him.  His batting average dropped almost 100 points to .220, but with 95 walks (5th-best in the American League) his on-base percentage remained high at .363.  In 1942, Gehringer lost the starting second baseman's job to a young Billy Hitchcock.  Gehringer played only three games at 2nd base in 1942, finding himself relegated to a pinch-hitting role.  He hit .267 (in 45 at-bats) with a .365 on-base percentage in his final year.

Gehringer enlisted in the U.S. Navy after the 1942 season.  He served three years, and was released in 1945.

Gehringer considered making a comeback at age 41.  "I came out of the service in such good shape that I felt I could've played a few years."  Instead, Gehringer went into business selling fabrics to automobile manufacturers.

In 1949, Gehringer was elected to the Baseball Hall of Fame by the Baseball Writers.  Gehringer received 159 votes on 187 ballots (85.03%).

Family
Gehringer's father died in 1924.  Though he only played five games as a Tiger in his rookie season of 1924, Gehringer moved his diabetic mother from the family farm outside Fowlerville, Michigan, to Detroit that year so there would be someone to look after her. Gehringer noted that his mother was a "great fan" who would either come out to the ballpark to watch him play or listen to Harry Heilmann's radio broadcasts on the porch.

Gehringer married Josephine Stillen in 1949, after his mother's death. Then 46, Gehringer speculated that he might have married earlier "but I couldn't see bringing a wife into that kind of situation."  He skipped his induction into the Baseball Hall of Fame on June 13, 1949, because he did not want it to interfere with his wedding five days later.  The couple remained married until Gehringer's death more than four decades later.

Retired Hall of Fame pitcher John Smoltz was a cousin of Gehringer. Smoltz stated "My grandmother was a Gehringer" during the Detroit Tigers vs. New York Yankees game broadcast on June 11, 2016, and added "I got a chance to play golf with him, when I think he was 81 years old, and he might have shot his age!"

Life after baseball

In 1950, Tigers owner Walter Briggs asked Gehringer to be the team's general manager, and he agreed to do so.  Gehringer later described the job as a "nightmare."  As he put it: "We had a lousy ball club, and I'd been away from baseball at that time for ten years. I didn't know who was and who wasn't." After serving as the Tigers general manager from 1951 to 1953, Gehringer was given the title of Tigers vice president in the mid-1950s. He went back to his business selling fabric to the automobile companies, continuing with the company until 1974 when he sold his interest in the business.

Gehringer also served as a member of the Baseball Hall of Fame's Committee on Baseball Veterans from 1953 to 1990.

At a 1983 ceremony in Tiger Stadium, the Tigers retired uniform numbers 2 and 5, worn for many years by teammates Gehringer and Hank Greenberg respectively. Both players attended the ceremony.

At age 82, Gehringer served as the American League honorary captain at the 1986 Major League Baseball All-Star Game at the Astrodome in Houston, Texas.

Gehringer died in Bloomfield Hills, Michigan, on January 21, 1993, at age 89.

In 1999, he ranked Number 46 on The Sporting News list of the 100 Greatest Baseball Players, and was nominated as a finalist for the Major League Baseball All-Century Team.  Also in 1999, Sports Illustrated published a list of "The 50 Greatest Sports Figures from Michigan" (in all sports), and ranked Gehringer third on the list behind Joe Louis and Magic Johnson.

In 2013, the Bob Feller Act of Valor Award honored Gehringer as one of 37 Baseball Hall of Fame members for his service in the United States Navy during World War II.

See also

 
 1935 Detroit Tigers season
 1937 Detroit Tigers season
 List of Major League Baseball doubles records
 List of Major League Baseball career hits leaders
 List of Major League Baseball career doubles leaders
 List of Major League Baseball career triples leaders
 List of Major League Baseball career runs scored leaders
 List of Major League Baseball career runs batted in leaders
 List of Major League Baseball players to hit for the cycle
 List of Major League Baseball batting champions
 List of Major League Baseball annual runs scored leaders
 List of Major League Baseball annual stolen base leaders
 List of Major League Baseball annual doubles leaders
 List of Major League Baseball annual triples leaders
 List of Major League Baseball career stolen bases leaders
 List of Major League Baseball players who spent their entire career with one franchise

References

Further reading 
 Honig, Donald (1975) Baseball When the Grass Was Real: Baseball from the Twenties to the Forties Told by the Men Who Played It. New York: Coward, McGann & Geoghegan. pp. 38–57. .
 Interview by Richard Bak at BaseballLibrary.com via Wayback Machine
 Career highights at BaseballLibrary.com via Wayback Machine

External links

Charlie Gehringer at SABR (Baseball BioProject)
Charlie Gehringer at Baseball Almanac
Charlie Gehringer at The Deadball Era

Charlie Gehringer Oral History Interview (1 of 2) - National Baseball Hall of Fame Digital Collection
Charlie Gehringer Oral History Interview (2 of 2) - National Baseball Hall of Fame Digital Collection

1903 births
1993 deaths
People from Fowlerville, Michigan
American people of German descent
American League All-Stars
American League batting champions
American League stolen base champions
National Baseball Hall of Fame inductees
Detroit Tigers players
Detroit Tigers executives
Major League Baseball executives
Major League Baseball general managers
Baseball players from Michigan
Major League Baseball second basemen
Michigan Wolverines baseball players
Toronto Maple Leafs (International League) players
Major League Baseball players with retired numbers
Detroit Tigers coaches
London Tecumsehs (baseball) players
American League Most Valuable Player Award winners
Sportspeople from Metro Detroit